Les Usherwood was born in England, studied in Kent and started his career as a lettering artist. He moved to Toronto, Ontario, Canada in 1957 and worked for various companies until he started Typsettra with David Thomason in 1968. The company supplied  typographic layouts, headline (on Typositor) and  text typesetting (on Berthold Diatronic), mechanicals, custom lettering and notably typeface design.

Typsettra did work for many important designers and art directors. In his role as a Type Director, Usherwood help create the unique style of detailed ‘jigsaw’ layout typography typified by tightly spaced custom headline faces, long text with many run-arounds. There is a clear comparison to the work of Herb Lubalin, Ed Benguiat, and U&lc magazine.

His untimely death in 1983 at 51, at the height of his career, was a shock. The Advertising & Design Club of Canada uses his name for their annual lifetime achievement award for which he was the first recipient.

Typeface designs

Les Usherwood was a prolific typeface designer creating over 200 faces for a variety uses and clients. His typefaces include Administer, Caxton (for Letraset), Flange (for Berthold), Kingsley, ITC (International Typeface Corporation) Leawood, and ITC Usherwood.

Bibliography
 Macmillan, Neil. An A-Z of Type Designers. London: Laurence King, 2006
 Warburton, Matt. Typsettra Recollections. Graphic Design Journal 6 (19XX): 2-8
 Mason, Dennis. Les Usherwood – A Legacy. Studio Magazine, Vol. 4 No. 1 (1986): 6-9
 Les Usherwood, a tribute. Etc. Summer, Lettraset, Canada, 1984: 3-5.
 Taylor, Kate. "Les Usherwood: Canada’s Greatest Type Designer." Applied Arts Quarterly. Autumn 1990. 59-62, 66, 68
 Toronto’s Design Pioneers. Communication Designers of Toronto (Cdot). Toronto: Winter 2008. 46-7

External links
 Myfonts My Fonts
 Typographica Typographica
 Advertising & Design Club of Canada 
 Berthold Type Foundry 

1932 births
1983 deaths
English expatriates in Canada
English typographers and type designers